Eftim Bogoev (born November 2, 1980) is a Macedonian professional basketball player born in Strumica. He was last under contract with  Strumica. He  is 1.85 m (6 ft 3 in) in height and plays the guard position.

Achievements
 Strumica 2005
Macedonian League Champion - 2007
 Feni Industri
Macedonian League Champion - 2010
 MZT Aerodrom
Macedonian League Champion - 2013
 AMAK SP
Macedonian Cup Champion - 2009
 Feni Industri
Macedonian Cup Champion - 2010
 Rabotnicki
Macedonian Cup Champion - 2011
 MZT Aerodrom
Macedonian Cup Champion - 2013

References

External links
 Eftim Bogoev profile on eurobasket.com

1980 births
Living people
Guards (basketball)
KK MZT Skopje players
KK Rabotnički players
Macedonian men's basketball players
Sportspeople from Strumica